The 2022 Stockholm Open was a professional men's tennis tournament played on indoor hard courts. It was the 53rd edition of the tournament, and part of the ATP Tour 250 series of the 2022 ATP Tour. It took place at the Kungliga tennishallen in Stockholm, Sweden from 17 to 23 October 2022.

Champions

Singles

  Holger Rune def.  Stefanos Tsitsipas, 6–4, 6–4

Doubles

  Marcelo Arévalo /  Jean-Julien Rojer def.  Lloyd Glasspool /  Harri Heliövaara, 6–3, 6–3

Singles main-draw entrants

Seeds

 Rankings are as of 10 October 2022

Other entrants
The following players received wildcards into the singles main draw:
  Leo Borg 
  Stefanos Tsitsipas 
  Elias Ymer 

The following player received entry as a special exempt:
  Mikael Ymer

The following players received entry from the qualifying draw:
  Antoine Bellier 
  Jason Kubler 
  Lukáš Rosol 
  Alexander Shevchenko

Withdrawals
Before the tournament
  Nikoloz Basilashvili → replaced by  J. J. Wolf
  Taylor Fritz → replaced by  Cristian Garín

Doubles main-draw entrants

Seeds

 Rankings are as of 10 October 2022

Other entrants
The following pairs received wildcards into the doubles main draw:
  Filip Bergevi /  Petros Tsitsipas 
  Leo Borg /  Simon Freund

The following pair received entry as alternates:
  Pavel Kotov /  Alexander Shevchenko

Withdrawals
  William Blumberg /  Tommy Paul → replaced by  Cameron Norrie /  Tommy Paul
  Jonathan Eysseric /  Constant Lestienne → replaced by  Jonathan Eysseric /  Quentin Halys
  André Göransson /  Ben McLachlan → replaced by  Ben McLachlan /  John-Patrick Smith
  Nikola Mektić /  Mate Pavić → replaced by  Roman Jebavý /  Adam Pavlásek
  Tim Pütz /  Michael Venus → replaced by  Pavel Kotov /  Alexander Shevchenko
  Rajeev Ram /  Joe Salisbury → replaced by  Robert Galloway /  Hans Hach Verdugo

References

External links
 Official website 

Stockholm Open
Stockholm Open
2022 in Swedish tennis
Stockholm Open
2020s in Stockholm